The 1968–69 Sheffield Shield season was the 67th season of the Sheffield Shield, the domestic first-class cricket competition of Australia. South Australia won the championship.

Table

Statistics

Most Runs
Colin Milburn 811

Most Wickets
Tony Lock 46

References

Sheffield Shield
Sheffield Shield
Sheffield Shield seasons